Lubów  is a village in the administrative district of Gmina Torzym, within Sulęcin County, Lubusz Voivodeship, in western Poland.

References

Villages in Sulęcin County